The 2019 Le Castellet Formula 2 round was a pair of motor races for Formula 2 cars that took place on 22 and 23 June 2019 at the Circuit Paul Ricard in Le Castellet, France as part of the FIA Formula 2 Championship. It was the fifth round of the 2019 FIA Formula 2 Championship and was run in support of the 2019 French Grand Prix.

Background

Driver changes
Jordan King returned to MP Motorsport after Artem Markelov stood in for him at the previous round of the championship in Monaco, allowing him to compete in the 2019 Indianapolis 500.

Classification

Qualifying

Notes
 – Luca Ghiotto was given a three-place grid penalty for causing a collision at the previous round in Monaco.
 – Mahaveer Raghunathan was given a three-place grid penalty for leaving the track and gaining an advantage at the previous round in Monaco.
 – Giuliano Alesi was ordered to start from the pit lane for causing a collision with Louis Delétraz during qualifying.

Feature race

Sprint race

Notes
 – Nikita Mazepin was given a five-second time penalty for leaving the track and gaining an advantage.
 – Sean Gelael was ordered to start from the pit lane for causing a collision with Mick Schumacher during the feature race.

Championship standings after the round

Drivers' Championship standings

Teams' Championship standings

References

External links 
 

Le Castellet
Le Castellet
Le Castellet Formula 2 round